The Croats are an ethnic group in Slovenia. In the 2002 census 35,642 citizens of Slovenia identified themselves as Croats.

History 

Croats have lived in the Slovene Lands for centuries. Most Croats and Slovenes were for centuries part of the same political entities, first the Habsburg Empire and then Yugoslavia. The number of Croats in the territory of modern Slovenia remained relatively small, as the Slovene lands before the 1950s experienced more emigration than immigration. During most of the history, Croats did not constitute a separate community, and many were assimilated by the Slovene, German or Venetian-speaking populations. After World War I, the number of Croats in Slovenia increased significantly, and more numerous communities were present in Ljubljana, Maribor and Celje. In the 1960s, the number of Croats increased significantly again as the result of a wave of relocation from Croatia and Bosnia and Herzegovina.

Legal status 

Unlike two other historic autochthonous minorities of Slovenia, the Hungarians and Italians, the Croats have not been granted minority status, although they are the second largest ethnic minority in Slovenia, after the Serbs (also not granted minority status). According to the Slovenian constitutional framework, only "historical minorities who have been living on clearly defined territories for centuries (and the Romani people, who have formed a distinct community since at least the 13th century can have the status of a minority". This would carry several constitutionally guaranteed rights, such as visible bilingualism and an autonomous educational system. All remaining minority members are guaranteed the right to express and develop freely their cultural and linguistic heritage, under the same laws applying to citizens in general, but lack the positive discrimination policies applied to the three constitutionally recognized minority communities, as well as the right to have state-sponsored schools in their languages.

In 2006, the Croatian Heritage Foundation along with the Federation of Croatian Societies of Slovenia organized the Week of Slovenian Croats in Zagreb as part of the heritage foundation's annual Croatian minority week.

Numbers
The number of Slovenian citizens of Croatian origin is difficult to establish. According to the 2001 census, 35,642 of them declared themselves as ethnically ("nationally", according to the Slovenian terminology) Croatian. In the same census, around 54,000 people declared Croatian as their mother tongue. Ten years earlier, more than 52,000 Slovenian citizens declared themselves as ethnically Croatian, while the number of those with Croatian as their mother tongue was around 50,000.

It seems however that the great majority of Croats living in Slovenia uses Slovene as their primary language of communication.
In 2001, only around 2,700 people spoke either Croatian or a combination of Croatian and Slovene at home, which is a significant decrease from in 1991, when their number  was around 10,000.

Number of self-declared ethnic Croats in Slovenia after World War II:

2002: 35,642 (1.81%)

Notable personalities
Slovenians of Croat ethnic origin include:

Srečko Katanec, football player and coach born to Croatian parents 
Jakov Fak, biathlete
Ivo Brnčić, literary critic
Izidor Cankar, essayist, art historian, translator and diplomat born to a Croat-German mother
Robert Kranjec, ski-jumper born to a Croat father 
Josip Iličić, football player 
Željko Ivanek, actor
Jelko Kacin, politician born to a Croat mother 
Miljenko Licul, designer
Sandi Lovrić, football player
Dragutin Mate, politician and diplomat
Stipe Modrić, former basketball player and coach born to a Croat father 
Duško Pavasovič, chess grandmaster; 
Dijana Ravnikar, biathlete and cross-country skier;
Ciril Ribičič, jurist and politician
Josip Ribičič, writer born to a Croat father
Mitja Ribičič, communist official and politician
Vanja Rupena, 1996 Miss Croatia
Goran Sankovič, football player
Ante Šimundža, former football player born to a Croatian father
Luka Šulić, cellist, member of the duo 2Cellos born to a Croat father 
Gregor Židan, former footballer born to Croatian parents 
Oton Župančič, poet and translator born to a Croat mother 
Jurica Golemac, basketball player and coach

See also
 Croatia–Slovenia relations
Demographics of Slovenia
 Croats
 List of Croats

References 

Slovenia
Ethnic groups in Slovenia